Five Suns is an album by progressive rock group Guapo released in 2004.

Track listing 
All music written by Guapo
Five Suns I (4:31)
Five Suns II (10:19)
Five Suns III (10:30)
Five Suns IV (12:57)
Five Suns V (7:55)
Total length: 46:34
(Untitled) (1:00)
Mictlan (8:58)
Topan (6:37)

Personnel 
Guapo
Daniel O'Sullivan – Fender Rhodes, Organ, Mellotron, Harmonium, Guitar, Electronics
Dave Smith – Drums, Percussion
Matt Thompson – Bass, Guitar, Electronics

Production
Pete Lyons – Engineer
Yukimaro Takematsu – Design, Art Direction

External links 
[| Guapo biography and other info at allmusic.com]
[| Five Suns review at allmusic.com]

2004 albums
Guapo (band) albums
Cuneiform Records albums